The Zepp music halls are a group of Japanese music venues covering every area of the country. They play host to many international tours and are a popular stop among Japanese musicians. Each venue takes the Zepp name, along with the city in which it is located. The Zepp company is a subsidiary of Sony Music Entertainment Japan. Starting from 2017, Zepp locations also opened in other countries like Singapore (formerly), Taiwan, and Malaysia.  In 2022, it opened its very first location in Malaysia at Bukit Bintang City Centre, Kuala Lumpur.

The Zepp venues in Japan are sponsored by the Asahi Breweries.

Locations

Current

Former

Shareholders
Asahi Breweries
Avex Group
Sony Music Entertainment Japan

References

External links

Zepp Official Site
Zepp Sapporo
Zepp Tokyo
Zepp DiverCity
Zepp Nagoya
Zepp Namba
Zepp Osaka Bayside
Zepp@BigBox

Music venues in Japan
Music venues in Malaysia
Music venues in Taiwan
Sony Music Entertainment Japan
Avex Group
1997 establishments in Japan